Fantastic Four, also known as Fantastic Four: The Animated Series, is the third animated television series based on Marvel's comic book series of the same name. Airing began on September 24, 1994, until ending on February 24, 1996. The series ran for two seasons, with 13 episodes per season, making 26 episodes in total.

Overview 
In the early-to-mid-1990s, Genesis Entertainment and New World Entertainment syndicated a new Fantastic Four animated series as part of the Marvel Action Hour weekend block, later renamed Marvel Action Universe (second use of the name), with the addition of another show. The first half of the hour was an episode of Iron Man; the second half an episode of Fantastic Four. During the first season, Stan Lee was featured speaking before each show about characters in the following episode and what had inspired him to create them.

The show has also aired on Fox Kids, and Disney XD in the United States.

Season 1 
Most episodes in the first season consisted of fairly accurate re-interpretations of classic 1960s Fantastic Four comic book stories by Stan Lee and Jack Kirby. For instance, this series stayed true to the original comic book story that recounted the Silver Surfer and Galactus' coming to Earth in a two-part episode as well as Doctor Doom's theft of the Surfer's powers. However, the season's cost-effective animation (provided by Wang Film Productions and Kennedy Cartoons) and attempts to add humor through the inclusion of a fussy British landlady (portrayed by Lee's wife Joan) for the Fantastic Four were generally met with displeasure by fans - to say nothing of then-current Fantastic Four comic book writer Tom DeFalco, who got in trouble for penning a scene in issue #396 of the series that featured Ant-Man watching and lambasting an episode of the cartoon.

It's also the only season to use digital ink and paint in some episodes.

In the two-part premiere "The Origin of the Fantastic Four", Puppet Master took control of the Thing and used him to capture Invisible Woman. Mister Fantastic freed the Thing from his control and defeated the Puppet Master. Upon returning to his apartment to reclaim his final doll, he ended up in a fight with Alicia Masters, and then he apparently fell to his death from the apartment window. The Fantastic Four weren't able to find his body and claimed that he "vanished from Earth."

In "The Silver Surfer & the Coming of Galactus", the Silver Surfer, Firelord, and Terrax fight the Fantastic Four while Galactus attempts to feed on Earth. By season 2 however, all but the presence of Silver Surfer in that battle is ignored as Terrax is seen again and referred to as being the replacement for the Silver Surfer. In the episode "When Calls Galactus", Terrax is killed/turned into a worm and Nova (Frankie Raye) becomes the new herald of Galatcus.

In the three-part special episode, "Mask of Doom", Doctor Doom captures the Fantastic Four and forces Mister Fantastic, Human Torch, and the Thing to go back in time and obtain an object for him. In the aforementioned episode "Silver Surfer and the Return of Galactus", Doom steals the Silver Surfer's powers and tries to steal Galactus' powers, only to be thwarted by the planet devourer himself.

Season 2 
Both the Fantastic Four and Iron Man series were radically retooled for its second and final season, sporting brand-new opening sequences, improved animation (as previously mentioned, the animation for the first season thirteen episodes was done by Wang Film Productions and Kennedy Cartoons, while the second season's animation was provided by the Philippine Animation Studio), and more mature writing (the first season was primarily written by Ron Friedman, while the second season was overseen by Tom Tataranowicz), though noticeably having fewer introductions by Stan Lee, with several of the new shorter intros being used more than once. Not only that, Four Freedoms Plaza replaced the Baxter Building as the Fantastic Four's home base in season 2. The season 2 episodes also drew upon John Byrne’s 1980s run on the Fantastic Four comic (as well as John Buscema's artwork), in addition to further Lee and Kirby adventures.

In the second season's premiere episode "And a Blind Man Shall Lead Them" (guest starring Daredevil), Doctor Doom strikes at a now fully powerless Fantastic Four and has his hand crushed by the Thing. Doom next appears in "Nightmare in Green", where he directs Hulk to attack the team.

Wizard appears in the episode "And the Wind Cries Medusa" (Part One of the three-part Inhumans Saga). In his debut appearance, he assembles Medusa, Hydro-Man, and Trapster to form the Frightful Four. On a related note, this episode aired one week from Hydro-Man's debut appearance in Spider-Man. Wizard also used a device to control the Thing. Meanwhile, Crystal, along with the other Inhumans Black Bolt, Gorgon, Karnak, and Lockjaw, also make their debut in the three-part "Inhumans Saga" episode. After escaping the Negative Barrier, Crystal goes on to become the girlfriend of the Human Torch. Seeker appears in the episode "Inhumans Saga: Beware the Hidden Land". He is sent by Maximus the Mad to retrieve the Inhuman Royal Family. After saving the Fantastic Four from the explosion, Seeker briefly shares the history of the Inhumans to them.

Susan Richards as Malice appears in the episode "Worlds Within Worlds". Malice's appearance is the result of Psycho-Man using his empathic abilities to make Susan turn against her Fantastic Four teammates. Eventually, Susan is freed of Psycho-Man's influence and defeats him.

The Black Panther appears in the "Prey of the Black Panther". He lures the Fantastic Four to Wakanda to see if they are worthy enough to help fight Klaw. As in the comics, Klaw's history of killing T'Chaka is included as well as T'Challa using Klaw's own weapon on his right hand.

In "To Battle the Living Planet," the Fantastic Four ask Galactus' help in confronting Ego the Living Planet. Thor meanwhile guest stars in two episodes. In "To Battle the Living Planet," the Fantastic Four help him fight Ego the Living Planet even when they enlist Galactus' help. In "When Calls Galactus," he and Ghost Rider (he uses the penance stare, so it is more likely it is the Daniel Ketch version instead of the Johnny Blaze version) both help the Fantastic Four fight Galactus. Also in "When Calls Galactus", Nova volunteers to replace the treacherous Terrax as Galactus' herald. As in the comics, Frankie Raye ends up getting her powers when she is accidentally doused in the chemicals that gave the android Human Torch his powers.

Franklin Storm appears in the episode "Behold, A Distant Star". Just like in the comics, Franklin Storm lost his wife in an accident, and an altercation with a loan shark led to an accidental murder. When Invisible Woman has shrapnel in the lower part of her brain after a recent Skrull attack (Lyja is shown as a commander to the Skrull army), he has to come out of hiding to perform the surgery. He turns himself over to the arriving police. After being freed from his volcanic prison, Super-Skrull replaces him in prison and takes on the guise of the Invincible Man, who breaks out of prison, goes on a rampage on the city, and runs afoul of the Fantastic Four. They soon realize that Franklin Storm is Super-Skrull in disguise. Warlord Morrat has a concussive energy beam projector attached to Dr. Storm's chest. The projector is set to go off the moment he sees the Fantastic Four. When Storm appears, he warns the Fantastic Four to stay away and rolls over on the floor, taking the full force of the deadly concussive blast.

In "Hopelessly Impossible", Lockjaw helps the Human Torch get the Impossible Man to The Great Refuge and away from the Super-Skrull.

In what turned out to be the series finale, "Doomsday", Doctor Doom acquires the almighty Power Cosmic. He once again tries to go after Galactus, only to hit the barrier that prevents the Silver Surfer from leaving Earth.

The Incredible Hulk crossover 

Simon Templeman reprised his role of Doctor Doom for guest appearances in two episodes, in which Doom held Washington, D.C. captive, only to be defeated by She-Hulk, whom he later attempted to claim revenge upon. With his appearance on this show, it can be assumed that Doom survived the fate he met on the Fantastic Four series, if both shows are to be considered within the same continuity.

Following Doctor Doom's first appearance (he appears again in the second-season episode "Hollywood Rocks"), comes the episode "Fantastic Fortitude" featuring his nemesis, the Fantastic Four. The episode seems to place this show in the same continuity with the Fantastic Four cartoon of the same decade, as this episode plays off the Hulk's appearance in the other show. More to the point, Beau Weaver (Reed Richards/Mister Fantastic) and Chuck McCann (Ben Grimm/The Thing) reprise their roles from the Fantastic Four series. In the episode, Mister Fantastic and the other Fantastic Four take their vacation prior to Hulk, She-Hulk, and Thing fighting Leader's Gamma Soldiers. Meanwhile, She-Hulk flirts with Thing, but Ben chooses to rekindle his relationship with Alicia Masters. While the Yancy Street Gang never appear in the solo Fantastic Four cartoon itself, they appear in "Fantastic Fortitude", where they pull a prank on the Thing. After being defeated by the villain Ogress, the Gang, always off camera, distributes leaflets marked "THING WHUPPED BY A WOMAN!", much to Thing's chagrin.

Proposed season 3 
According to season 2 supervising producer Tom Tataranowicz, had there had been a third season of Fantastic Four, he would have wanted to go into the whole Sue Storm pregnancy story arc. In Tataranowicz's eyes, this would have given the production crew a chance to do their own take on the Sub-Mariner (who only appeared in season 1), as he played into the arc in Fantastic Four issues leading up to and around issue #100. Tataranowicz also wanted to bring Medusa and She-Hulk into the mix as part of the Fantastic Four.

Cast

Main 
 Beau Weaver – Reed Richards / Mister Fantastic, Trapster, Admiral Koh, T'Chaka
 Lori Alan – Susan Storm-Richards / Invisible Woman
 Quinton Flynn – Johnny Storm / Human Torch (season 2)
 Chuck McCann – Benjamin "Ben" Jacob Grimm / The Thing
 Brian Austin Green –Johnny Storm / Human Torch (season 1)
 Neil Ross – Doctor Doom (season 1), Puppet Master, Warlord Krang, Super-Skrull (season 1)
 Simon Templeman – Doctor Doom (season 2)
 Pauline Arthur Lomas – Alicia Masters

Guest cast 
 Edward Albert – Norrin Radd / Silver Surfer (season 2)
 Gregg Berger – Mole Man
 Mary Kay Bergman – Princess Anelle
 Jane Carr – Lady Dorma
 Rocky Carroll – Triton (first voice)
 Dick Clark – Himself
 Jim Cummings – Slash Curtis, Bull Donovan, Skink Lomas, President Bill Clinton, Votan
 Keith David – Black Panther
 Michael Dorn – Gorgon
 Ron Feinberg – Terrax (season 2)
 Ron Friedman – Blastaar
 Brad Garrett – Hydro-Man
 George Gee – Himself
 Dan Gilvezan – Warlord Morrat
 Benny Grant – Rick Jones
 Richard Grieco – Danny Ketch / Ghost Rider
 Mark Hamill – Kree Sentry, Maximus the Mad, Triton (second voice)
 Jess Harnell – Impossible Man, Super-Skrull (season 2)
 Jamie Horton – Psycho-Man
 Charles Howerton – Klaw
 Kathy Ireland – Crystal
 Tony Jay – Galactus, Terrax (season 1)
 Green Jelly – Themselves
 Clyde Kusatsu – Annihilus, Karnak
 Kay E. Kuter – Ego the Living Planet
 Joan Lee – Mrs. Lavinia Forbes
 Stan Lee – Himself
 Kerrigan Mahan – Seeker
 Leeza Miller McGee – Nova
 Richard McGonagle – Franklin Storm
 Katherine Moffat – Commander Lyja
 Iona Morris – Medusa
 Alan Oppenheimer – Firelord, Uatu the Watcher
 Gary Owens – Himself
 Ron Perlman – Bruce Banner / Hulk, Wizard
 Riff Regan – Melinda
 John Rhys-Davies – Thor
 Robert Ridgely – Skrull Emperor
 Robin Sachs – Norrin Radd / Silver Surfer (season 1)
 Bill Smitrovich – Daredevil
 Gina Tuttle – Female TV Reporter
 James Warwick – Namor, Sam Jaggers
 Ian Trigger – The Jeweler

Episodes

Season 1 (1994)

Season 2 (1995–1996)

The Incredible Hulk crossover 
Chuck McCann and Beau Weaver reprised their roles (as the Thing and Mister Fantastic respectively) on The Incredible Hulk.

Spider-Man crossover 
Only Quinton Flynn (who replaced Brian Austin Green as the voice of the Human Torch in the second season) came back for Spider-Man. Beau Weaver, Lori Alan, and Chuck McCann were replaced by Cam Clarke, Gail Matthius, and Patrick Pinney as Mister Fantastic, the Invisible Woman, and the Thing respectively, and Doctor Doom was voiced by veteran voice actor Tom Kane for parts 2 and 3.

Broadcast and release 
Despite the fact that the show ended in 1996, the success of the live-action Fantastic Four film have sparked more interest in new fans, allowing the series to air in reruns on Jetix block on Toon Disney due to its new owners: The Walt Disney Company.

In February 2012, Marvel.com uploaded every episode for streaming purposes, although they have now been removed.

The entire series is available to purchase on the iTunes Store, Amazon Prime Video, and Google TV.

The series with both seasons combined into one complete season has been shown on Disney's streaming service Disney+ since its launch on November 12, 2019, however, the episode "Incursion of the Skrulls" is omitted for reasons unknown.

Home media

VHS 
During the series' run, some episodes were released on VHS. These were from 20th Century Fox Home Entertainment.

In the late 1990s, another selection of VHS compilations were released by Marvel Films/New World Entertainment (these tapes were distributed in Canada by Telegenic Entertainment). These releases featured episodes edited into 40 minute movies based on the particular story arc.

DVD

Region 1

On July 5, 2005, Buena Vista Home Entertainment released the complete series on a 4-disc Region 1 DVD boxset. This set was created to cash-in on the release of the live-action film which was released theatrically a few days later. It features new introductions by Stan Lee for all 26 episodes (replacing the original introductions, which had been removed for network broadcast) as well as an interview where Stan Lee talks about how he created the Fantastic Four. Additionally, pieces of footage from the episodes themselves had also been removed for network broadcast, and it is these cut episodes that comprise the DVD set.

Region 2
In July 2005, Buena Vista Home Entertainment released a Region 2 single-release DVD titled Fantastic Four: A Legend Begins. It comprises the first two episodes and the trilogy of the first appearance of Doctor Doom, and includes the same bonus features as the US boxset.

In April 2008, Liberation Entertainment secured the home media rights to select Marvel shows from Jetix Europe in select European territories. The company were due to release both seasons in the United Kingdom, but the company shuttered their UK operations on October 22, 2008. Lace International released their remaining stock, including both seasons of the show and a boxset containing all twenty-six episodes in November 2008, with remastered video and audio footage. In April 2009, Liberation released the Seasons 1 and 2 boxset in some European countries with Dutch subtitles.

Clear Vision later took over UK and German distribution rights, re-releasing the season volumes as separate sets. Season 1 was released on May 4, 2009 and May 13, 2009, while Season 2 was released on June 10, 2009 and June 17, 2009.

Comics 
An 8 issues comic-book series based on the show was published by Marvel:
 Marvel Action Hour: Fantastic Four (November 1994 to June 1995)

Merchandising 
An action figure line based on the TV show was produced by Toy Biz, and ran for four series. The line included the main characters and many of the various guest-stars, as well as characters that never even appeared on the show, such as Dragon Man and Thanos.

References

External links 

 DRG4's Fantastic Four: The Animated Series page
 Marvel Animation Age - Fantastic Four 
 International Catalogue of Superheroes
 Fantastic Four (1996) - Pazsaz Entertainment Network
 Headquarters - A Critical History of the Fantastic Four
 

1990s American animated television series
1994 American television series debuts
1996 American television series endings
American children's animated action television series
American children's animated adventure television series
American children's animated science fantasy television series
American children's animated superhero television series
Television shows based on Marvel Comics
Animated television series based on Marvel Comics
First-run syndicated television programs in the United States
Fox Kids
UPN Kids
Jetix original programming
UPN original programming
Television series by Saban Entertainment